Vladimir Anatoliyevich Bidyovka (born 7 March 1981) is a politician from the Donbas region, who currently serves as Chairman of the People's Council of the Donetsk People's Republic (DPR) since 2018. Prior to the conflict in the east Ukraine region, after which he supported DPR independence, he served as a lawmaker in the Ukrainian Verkhovna Rada between 2012 and 2014.

Biography 
Bidyovka was born on 7 March 1981 in Makiyivka, Ukraine. He was a member of the Communist Party of Ukraine until 2015. He represented the party from 2010–2012 as a member of Donetsk Regional Council and in 2012 represented it as an MP. After failing to gain a seat in the 2014 election, he moved to regions controlled by the Donetsk People's Republic, where he was elected to its legislature in November 2014. He replaced Olga Makeeva as Chairman of the People's Council of the Donetsk People's Republic on 20 November 2018. Bidyovka was also on a list of persons designated by the European Union as being involved in illegal elections and had financial sanctions imposed against.

References 

1981 births
21st-century Ukrainian politicians
Communist Party of Ukraine politicians
Living people
People from Makiivka
Seventh convocation members of the Verkhovna Rada
Pro-Russian people of the 2014 pro-Russian unrest in Ukraine
People of the Donetsk People's Republic
Pro-Russian people of the war in Donbas
Ukrainian collaborators with Russia